The Movement for European Reform, abbreviated to MER, was a pan-European alliance of national centre-right political parties with conservative, pro-free market and Eurosceptic inclinations.  It consisted of the Conservative Party of the United Kingdom and the Civic Democratic Party of the Czech Republic.

Founded on 13 July 2006, MER was created as a precursor to the Alliance of European Conservatives and Reformists (AECR) and European Conservatives and Reformists (ECR), a political group in the European Parliament that was launched in June 2009 following European elections.  Its operations folded into the ECR and the AECR later that year.

History 
MER was formed as an interim measure to function outside the European Parliament until a new group could be formed within it after the 2009 elections. Until then, its MEPs continued as members of the now-dissolved ED subgroup within the broader EPP-ED group.

Since its launch, it was unclear as to whether the MER would remain a simple pan-European alliance or apply for official recognition as a political party at European level (sometimes called a Europarty). The body's founding statement expressly offered membership to parties from non-EU member states, a characteristic of other Europarties, and its commitment to fight the 2009 election together suggested an appetite for recognition.

After the 2009 European election, members of the MER initiated the European Conservatives and Reformists Group, a new political group in the European Parliament.

The MER website stopped being updated in 2007 and, in June 2009, the British Conservative Shadow Foreign Secretary William Hague said that the MER's aims and activities would be folded into the new European Parliamentary group.

Ideology 
MER's position was that the European Union should exist; however, it should be a looser supranational organisation than the current structure. This makes it more Eurosceptic than the three major European-level political movements (the European People's Party, Party of European Socialists and European Liberal Democrat and Reform Party), but less Eurosceptic than formations such as the Europe of Freedom and Democracy, the successor to the Independence and Democracy group in the European Parliament.

Members 
Members of MER were:

 - Conservative Party
 - Civic Democratic Party

In the first week of March 2007, under Petar Stoyanov, the Bulgarian Union of Democratic Forces (UDF) decided to join. A day after the UDF's announcement, the Presidency of the European People's Party (EPP) recommended that UDF be suspended from the EPP. The President of the EPP Wilfried Martens justified the suspension, arguing that:

In mid April 2007, the UDF backtracked and stated that it remained loyal to the EPP and that it would never leave the EPP section of the EPP-ED Group to join another Group. A month later, in the first-ever elections for the European Parliament in Bulgaria (20 May 2007) the UDF failed to elect any seats. As a result, Petar Stoyanov - who was accused by his critics of making poor decisions during the campaign, including the MER choice - resigned as UDF leader. In September 2007, the UDF formally withdrew from the MER and re-affirmed its membership with the EPP.

References

External links
Official website, expired domain
Notes from the Conservative Party on the MER (PDF)
Speech by David Cameron on founding of MER

Eurosceptic parties
European Conservatives and Reformists
Political parties established in 2006
Political parties disestablished in 2009
Pan-European political parties
Conservative parties in Europe
2006 establishments in the European Union
2009 disestablishments in the European Union